The 2017–18 Swiss League season was the 71st ice hockey season of Switzerland's second tier hockey league. It was the first season completed as the rebranded Swiss League.

Teams

Regular season
The regular season started on 9 September 2017 and ended on 12 February 2018.

Playoffs

League Qualification

EHC Kloten vs. SC Rapperswil-Jona Lakers

References

External links
 
 Swiss League
Swiss League 

National League B seasons
2017–18 in Swiss ice hockey
Swiss